The 2006 NCAA Women's Division I Swimming and Diving Championships were contested at the 25th annual NCAA-sanctioned swim meet to determine the team and individual national champions of Division I women's collegiate swimming and diving in the United States. 

This year's events were hosted at Gabrielsen Natatorium at the University of Georgia in Athens, Georgia. 

Auburn returned to the top of the team standings after a one year absence, finishing a mere three points (518.5−515.5) ahead of hosts and defending champions Georgia. This was the Tigers' fourth women's team title and fourth in five seasons.

Team standings
Note: Top 10 only
(H) = Hosts
(DC) = Defending champions
Full results

See also
List of college swimming and diving teams

References

NCAA Division I Swimming And Diving Championships
NCAA Division I Swimming And Diving Championships
NCAA Division I Women's Swimming and Diving Championships